In music, semifusa may refer to two distinct note values:
 a value in mensural notation corresponding to the modern sixteenth note 
 the modern Spanish word for a sixty-fourth note